Ulrike Leyckes (born Ulrike Urbansky; 6 April 1977 in Jena) is a German former light athlete who specialized in the 400 metres hurdles. She competed in the Olympic Games in Sydney in 2000 and Athens in 2004, each time reaching the semi-final. Her personal best time is 54.57 seconds, achieved in July 2000 in Barcelona. She retired from competitive sport in 2009.

She married decathlete Dennis Leyckes in September 2008.

Achievements

References

External links 
 

1977 births
Living people
Sportspeople from Jena
People from Bezirk Gera
German female hurdlers
Olympic athletes of Germany
Athletes (track and field) at the 2000 Summer Olympics
Athletes (track and field) at the 2004 Summer Olympics
World Athletics Championships athletes for Germany
German national athletics champions
Universiade medalists in athletics (track and field)
Universiade bronze medalists for Germany
Medalists at the 1999 Summer Universiade
20th-century German women